Olivier Kamitatu Etsu (born 17 April 1964 in Brussels) politician of the Democratic Republic of the Congo, and former Planning Minister in the government of Matata Ponyo Mapon and the leader of the Alliance for the Renewal of Congo (ARC) political party. Kamitatu is the President of the Africa Liberal Network.

Career 
Kamitatu was a member of the Movement for the Liberation of Congo of Jean-Pierre Bemba who was appointed Speaker of the Transitional National Assembly. However, he was suspended by Bemba and founded the Alliance for the Renewal of Congo.

The ARC allied with the RCD-K-ML of Antipas Mbusa to form the Forces for Renewal, who backed Mbusa in the 2006 presidential elections. In the end, Mbusa decided to stand aside in favour of Joseph Kabila before the election and the Forces for Renewal joined the pro-government coalition Alliance of the Presidential Majority. The ARC won 2 seats in the election to the National Assembly.

Forces for Renewal joined the government of Antoine Gizenga in 2007 and Kamitatu became Planning Minister. Kamitatu is also a member of the political bureau for Together for Change, the opposition political coalition formed by former Katanga governor Moïse Katumbi to support his presidential bid in the upcoming 2018 presidential election.

Personal life 
Kamitatu is the son of Cléophas Kamitatu, a politician who was heavily involved in Congolese independence.

See also 

 Christophe Mboso N'Kodia Pwanga
 Jeannine Mabunda
 Gabriel Kyungu wa Kumwanza

References

1964 births
Living people
Politicians from Brussels
Movement for the Liberation of the Congo politicians
Alliance for the Renewal of Congo politicians
Government ministers of the Democratic Republic of the Congo
Presidents of the National Assembly (Democratic Republic of the Congo)